Jeffrey William Newman OAM (born 4 February 1944) is a former Australian television presenter. He was the Seven Network's weather presenter in Perth from 1991 to 2009.

Media career
Newman began his media career with 6GE in Geraldton, Western Australia in early 1963, filling a vacancy left by the departure of Tony Barber. When STW-9 began broadcasting in 1965, Newman became host of The Jeff Newman Show.

After a disagreement with management, he crossed over to the rival TVW-7 in 1967 and worked in various positions within the industry, before joining Seven News in 1982 as a newsreader. He was the weather presenter on Seven News from 1991 to 2009. Newman was also known for his role as Western Australian presenter of It's Academic, a popular school quiz program that ran for ten years from 1969 to 1979 and later revived from 2001 and 2005. He also served as the main anchor host of the annual Perth Telethon between 1968- 2009.

His brother is Peter Newman, another well-known Perth media personality.

Retirement
Newman announced his retirement on 1 July 2009 and was replaced by Natalia Cooper. He did his last weather broadcast on 10 August 2009.

In 2013 he revealed to The West Australian that he was battling prostate cancer. He has since recovered.

Honours
Newman won five Logie Awards for the state's most popular male television personality. In 1994 he was awarded the Medal of the Order of Australia for services to charity and fundraising.

References

External links
Jeff Newmans last weather broadcast

1944 births
Living people
Australian game show hosts
Seven News presenters
People educated at Mount Lawley Senior High School